The Communauté urbaine du Grand Reims is the communauté urbaine, an intercommunal structure, centred on the city of Reims. It is located in the Marne department, in the Grand Est region, northeastern France. It was created on 1 January 2017 by the merger of the previous communauté d'agglomération Reims Métropole with the communautés de communes Beine-Bourgogne, Champagne Vesle, Nord Champenois, Fismes Ardre et Vesle, Vallée de la Suippe, Rives de la Suippe, Vesle et Coteaux de la Montagne de Reims and 18 other communes. Its area is 1432.4 km2. Its population was 295,926 in 2018, of which 182,211 lived in Reims proper.

Composition
The communauté urbaine consists of the following 143 communes:

Anthenay
Aougny
Arcis-le-Ponsart
Aubérive
Aubilly
Auménancourt
Baslieux-lès-Fismes
Bazancourt
Beaumont-sur-Vesle
Beine-Nauroy
Berméricourt
Berru
Bétheniville
Bétheny
Bezannes
Billy-le-Grand
Bligny
Bouilly
Bouleuse
Boult-sur-Suippe
Bourgogne-Fresne
Bouvancourt
Branscourt
Breuil-sur-Vesle
Brimont
Brouillet
Caurel
Cauroy-lès-Hermonville
Cernay-lès-Reims
Châlons-sur-Vesle
Chambrecy
Chamery
Champfleury
Champigny
Chaumuzy
Chenay
Chigny-les-Roses
Cormicy
Cormontreuil
Coulommes-la-Montagne
Courcelles-Sapicourt
Courcy
Courlandon
Courmas
Courtagnon
Courville
Crugny
Cuisles
Dontrien
Écueil
Époye
Faverolles-et-Coëmy
Fismes
Germigny
Gueux
Hermonville
Heutrégiville
Hourges
Isles-sur-Suippe
Janvry
Jonchery-sur-Vesle
Jonquery
Jouy-lès-Reims
Lagery
Lavannes
Lhéry
Loivre
Ludes
Magneux
Mailly-Champagne
Marfaux
Merfy
Méry-Prémecy
Les Mesneux
Montbré
Montigny-sur-Vesle
Mont-sur-Courville
Muizon
Nogent-l'Abbesse
Olizy
Ormes
Pargny-lès-Reims
Les Petites-Loges
Pévy
Poilly
Pomacle
Pontfaverger-Moronvilliers
Pouillon
Pourcy
Prosnes
Prouilly
Prunay
Puisieulx
Reims
Rilly-la-Montagne
Romain
Romigny
Rosnay
Sacy
Saint-Brice-Courcelles
Saint-Étienne-sur-Suippe
Saint-Euphraise-et-Clairizet
Saint-Gilles
Saint-Hilaire-le-Petit
Saint-Léonard
Saint-Martin-l'Heureux
Saint-Masmes
Saint-Souplet-sur-Py
Saint-Thierry
Sarcy
Savigny-sur-Ardres
Selles
Sept-Saulx
Sermiers
Serzy-et-Prin
Sillery
Taissy
Thil
Thillois
Tinqueux
Tramery
Trépail
Treslon
Trigny
Trois-Puits
Unchair
Val-de-Vesle
Vandeuil
Vaudemange
Vaudesincourt
Ventelay
Verzenay
Verzy
Ville-Dommange
Ville-en-Selve
Ville-en-Tardenois
Villers-Allerand
Villers-aux-Nœuds
Villers-Franqueux
Villers-Marmery
Vrigny
Warmeriville
Witry-lès-Reims

Administration 
The communauté urbaine is led by an indirectly elected President along with a bureau communautaire composed of 15 Vice-Presidents and 44 additional elected members.

President

Elected members 
The Communauté urbaine du Grand Reims is governed by an elected council composed of 206 councillors from each of the 143 communes in Grand Reims. The number of council seats each commune receives is proportional based upon their population as follows:

 59 delegates for Reims
 3 delegates for Tinqueux
 2 delegates for each of Bétheny, Bourgogne-Fresne and Cormicy 
 1 delegate for each of the remaining 138 communes

Administrative seat 
The administrative seat of the communauté urbaine is located in Reims at 3 Rue Eugène-Desteuque.

References

Reims
Reims